Arthur John Francis (4 December 1886 – 15 October 1952) was an Australian rules footballer who played for the Fitzroy Football Club in the Victorian Football League (VFL).

In 2003, Francis was named in the Rutherglen Football Club's Team of the Century.

Notes

External links 
		

1886 births
1952 deaths
Australian rules footballers from Victoria (Australia)
Fitzroy Football Club players
Rutherglen Football Club players